Alfred-Felix Vaucher (March 18, 1887 – May 22, 1993) was an Italian theologian, church historian, and bibliographer. He was a pioneer in the history and study of Seventh-day Adventism.

Preaching his first sermon at age 14, Vaucher studied at a church in Paris. In 1903, he was engaged by the Adventist church, to which he devoted an active ministry of approximately eighty years.

Vaucher traveled around Europe, including Switzerland and Italy as a Seventh-day Adventist evangelist. He published over 1,100 articles and pamphlets on French church history and wrote a score of books, some of which are: L'Histoire du Salut, Le P. Manuel Lacunza y Diaz, L'Antichrist, Le Jour du Repos, and Le Jour Seigneurial. Vaucher also taught at Salève Adventist University, Collonges-sous-Salève, Haute-Savoie, a French biblical college, from 1921-1941 and 1945–1983.

He died at age 106.

See also 

 Seventh-day Adventist Church
 Seventh-day Adventist theology
 Seventh-day Adventist eschatology
 History of the Seventh-day Adventist Church
 28 Fundamental Beliefs
 Questions on Doctrine
 Teachings of Ellen G. White
 Inspiration of Ellen G. White
 Prophecy in the Seventh-day Adventist Church
 Investigative judgment
 Pillars of Adventism
 Second Coming
 Conditional Immortality
 Historicism
 Three Angels' Messages
 Sabbath in seventh-day churches
 Ellen G. White
 Adventism
 Seventh-day Adventist Church Pioneers
 Seventh-day Adventist worship

References 

Vaucher, A. (1949). Une celebrite oubliee: Le P. Manuel de Lacunza y Diaz (1731-1801) de la Societe de Jesus, auteur de "La venue du Messie en gloire et majeste." Collonges-sous-Salève: Imprimerie Fides.

Vaucher, A. (1951). L'Histoire du salut (3e éd.). Dammarie-les-Lys (S.-et-M.): Éditions S.D.T.

Vaucher, A. (1960). L'Antichrist. Collonges-sous-Salève: Imprimerie Fides.

Vaucher, A. (1962). Le jour du repos. Collonges-sous-Salève: Imprimerie Fides.

Vaucher, A. (1970). Le jour seigneurial. Collonges-sous-Salève: Imprimerie Fides.
Un dernier hommage à Alfred-Félix Vaucher, Jean Zurcher, Revue adventiste, September 1993, pp. 12–13
Essai bibliographique sur l'œuvre d'Alfred Vaucher Pietro Copiz, Revue adventiste, 15 June 1987, pp. 13–15
Alfred Vaucher R. Lehmann, Dictionnaire du monde religieux dans la France contemporaine, vol. 8 La Savoie. Paris : Beauchesne, 1996. pp. 404–405

External links 
Good Teachers Are Forever by Nilton Amorim, Superintendent/President, Quebec Conference, in Canadian Adventist Teachers Network Online Journal, July 1999

1887 births
1993 deaths
French centenarians
Seventh-day Adventist religious workers
Seventh-day Adventist theologians
20th-century Protestant theologians
20th-century French theologians
French Christian theologians
French Seventh-day Adventists
Seventh-day Adventist missionaries in Switzerland
Seventh-day Adventist missionaries in Italy
French bibliographers
French male writers
Men centenarians
People from Luserna San Giovanni